MCPP may stand for:

 The Mackinac Center for Public Policy – an American free market think tank headquartered in Midland, Michigan
 Marine Corps Planning Process – a group planning process developed by the United States Marine Corps that is designed to help its units with staffs plan operations, and to provide input to operations planning with other military services
 mcpp – a C preprocessor
 Medical Cannabis Pilot Program Act (Illinois)
 meta-Chlorophenylpiperazine (mCPP) – a recreational drug and stimulant of the piperazine class
 Methylchlorophenoxypropionic acid (Mecoprop) – a herbicide
 Mixed Chinese postman problem – a search problem in mathematics
The Modern Corporation and Private Property (1932) by AA Berle and GC Means